Edward Horsfall may refer to:

Edward Horsfall (rugby union) on List of England national rugby union players
Edward Horsfall of the Horsfall Baronets